Jose Luis Ceballos (born 1959) was the Government Affairs Director for the National Air Traffic Controllers Association (NATCA) until March 2021.

Ceballos graduated from Florida State University in 1991, and ran campaign operations for vice-presidential nominee John Edwards. Prior to the campaign, Ceballos served as director of Policy & Strategic Planning at the National Air Traffic Controllers Association (NATCA), where he focused on grassroots advocacy campaigns. Ceballos has worked for Vice President Al Gore, Transportation Secretary Rodney Slater, and Commerce Secretary Ron Brown.

References 

Living people
People from New York City
Florida State University alumni
Democratic Party (United States) politicians
1959 births